
Creighton Lee Lovelace (born December 15, 1981) is an American Christian minister, currently the pastor of Danieltown Baptist Church in Forest City, North Carolina.  Lovelace and his church received brief international attention in May 2005 over a controversial sign on the Danieltown church's grounds that read, "The Koran needs to be flushed!"

This appeared in The Daily Courier, the local newspaper covering Forest City, in a story written by Josh Humphries shortly after a May 1, 2005, report in Newsweek that US officials had flushed a Koran down a toilet at Guantanamo Bay detainment camp (see Qur'an desecration controversy of 2005).  That statement proved to be false and Newsweek retracted the story, and apologized on May 15.  Apparently a Koran had been desecrated in some way, but not involving a toilet.  The original report received widespread international attention and sparked protests in Muslim countries.  At least fifteen people in died in a protest riot in Jalalabad, Afghanistan over the story.

Lovelace and his church posted the sign as the Newsweek controversy unfolded.  This inflammatory message received attention from the Associated Press, all major United States news networks, and various international publications.  In a May 25 MSNBC interview, Lovelace denied that his congregation desecrated any actual Korans.  Unapologetic for the sign, he said the message was "a figure of speech."  In conservative Christian theology Muslims cannot enter heaven.

In a Christianity Today article about the Danieltown Baptist Church sign, Anthony McRoy wrote:  No specific attacks on Christians or United States citizens have been linked to this incident.

Following two days of intense and universally negative press coverage, Lovelace issued an apology.  On June 8, 2005, the Associated Baptist Press reported that Danieltown Baptist Church had withdrawn from the Southern Baptist Convention, the Baptist State Convention of North Carolina and the local Sandy Run Baptist Association.

See also 
Christian right
Qur'an desecration controversy of 2005
Religious intolerance

References

External links 
Danieltown Baptist Church
The Digital Courier

1981 births
Living people
People from Shelby, North Carolina
Baptist ministers from the United States
North Carolina Constitutionalists
North Carolina Republicans
People from Forest City, North Carolina
Christian critics of Islam
Baptists from North Carolina
American critics of Islam